Arthur Cecil Stuart Barkly (1843 – 27 September 1890) was a British colonial governor and judge.

Life
Barkly was the son of Elizabeth Helen (born Timins) and Henry Barkly. His father was a British politician and colonial administrator. He was his father's private secretary while his father was governor of Mauritius (1863–70) and governor of the Cape Colony (1870–77).

In 1877, Barkly was appointed resident magistrate in Basutoland. He served in this position until 1881, and he became Commissioner of Seychelles.

In 1886, Barkly became Lieutenant Governor of the Falkland Islands. In 1887 he was transferred back to Seychelles and continued there as Commissioner until 1888.

In 1888, Barkly became the Governor of Heligoland. He was the final British governor of Heligoland, departing on 9 August 1890 after sovereignty over Heligoland had been passed to Germany via the Heligoland–Zanzibar Treaty.

Barkley died shortly thereafter in Stapleton Park, near Pontefract, West Yorkshire, United Kingdom.

References
John Benyon, "Barkly, Sir Henry (1815–1898), also including Arthur Cecil Stuart Barkly (1843–1890)", Oxford Dictionary of National Biography, Oxford University Press, September 2004; online edn, January 2008, accessed 29 August 2008.

1843 births
1890 deaths
Basutoland judges
British Mauritius people
Cape Colony people
Governors of British Seychelles
Governors of the Falkland Islands
Lieutenant Governors of Heligoland